Jay “Baby J” Jones is an American radio personality. He hosted Traffic Jammin' with Baby J and was the Program Director at WCHZ-FM HOT 95.5/93.1 in Augusta, Georgia.

Radio career
Baby J got his first break in radio at WAAA-AM in Winston-Salem, North Carolina, where he played old school RnB on the weekends. He quickly picked up on the craft of running a successful radio program. In 1995 he began with WJMH-FM 102 Jamz in Greensboro, North Carolina hosting Over Night Flava midnight show from 12am to 6am and produced their morning show.

In 1999, he received the call to do morning drive at WWWZ-FM Z93 Jamz, in Charleston, South Carolina, where he hosted The Breakfuss Club morning show, which began in Charleston, South Carolina, and hosted the syndicated MTV Top 20 Countdown on the weekends. The Breakfuss Club morning show became syndicated in 2005 in Providence, Rhode Island, where Citadel Broadcasting transferred the show to a larger market. The show remained in Providence, Rhode Island until 2007 then transferred back to Charleston, South Carolina. In 2011 Citadel Broadcasting was bought out by Cumulus Media, which resulted in the termination of the show in November 2011.

In December 2011 Baby J began working afternoon drive at WXST-FM Star 99.7 in Charleston, South Carolina.

In early 2013 he began hosting the Wake Up Show at WFXE-FM Foxie 105, Columbus, Georgia. In March 2014, he began the Afternoon Traffic Jam weekdays from 3 to 7pm.

On March 16, 2015, Baby J became the new Program Director and host of "Traffic Jammin' with Baby J" weekdays from 2 to 6pm at WCHZ-FM HOT 95.5/93.1 Augusta, Georgia #1 for Nonstop Throwback Hip Hop and R&B.

References

External links
 https://www.linkedin.com/in/radiobabyj

Living people
People from Louisburg, North Carolina
American radio personalities
Year of birth missing (living people)